Shahar Balilti (born 20 March 1990) is an Israeli football forward. He currently plays for Hapoel Bik'at HaYarden.

External links 
 

1990 births
Israeli Jews
Living people
Israeli footballers
Hapoel Petah Tikva F.C. players
Hakoah Maccabi Amidar Ramat Gan F.C. players
Hapoel Katamon Jerusalem F.C. players
Maccabi Ironi Kiryat Ata F.C. players
Hapoel Bik'at HaYarden F.C. players
F.C. Kafr Qasim players
Israeli Premier League players
Liga Leumit players
Footballers from Petah Tikva
Israeli people of Moroccan-Jewish descent
Association football forwards